The Maine Warden Service is a police agency in the United States State of Maine responsible for the enforcement of fisheries and wildlife laws, and the coordination of search and rescue in wilderness areas of the state. Maine's game wardens strive to protect the state's fishing and hunting resources, Enforcing strict limits on the activities listed above to keep animal populations stable. Maine's Warden Service is operationally part of Maine's Department of Inland Fisheries and Wildlife, it is the oldest conservation law enforcement agency in the United States.

History
Maine began enforcement of hunting seasons in 1830 with game wardens appointed by the Governor of Maine responsible for enforcing seasonal restrictions. The Maine Warden Service was established fifty years later, in 1880, with an initial mandate to enforce newly-enacted regulations related to the state's moose population. The United States' oldest conservation law enforcement agency, over time its authority was expanded to include wildlife generally, including inland fisheries.

In 1886 the Maine Warden Service saw its first line of duty death, when Wardens Lyman Hill and Charles Niles were shot and killed at the end of a ten-day pursuit, on horseback, of a poacher. The deaths are believed to be the first line of duty deaths of game wardens in American history. Since then, the Maine Warden Service has seen an additional 13 line of duty deaths.

From 2012 to 2016, the Maine Warden Service was the subject of a television documentary series, North Woods Law, aired by Animal Planet. The service ended its participation in the program after a Portland Press Herald story which implied an undercover operation had been influenced by the production company. Officials denied the accusation, with the Maine Warden Service saying they had initially agreed to the documentary series to help recruiting efforts and that goal had been realized, while then-Governor of Maine Paul LePage said he had called for an end to the production because he felt the content of shows reflected poorly on Maine.

Organization and training
The Warden Service is headed by the Director of the Bureau of the Warden Service, who holds the rank of colonel.

As of 2017, Maine Wardens were required to complete a 30-week training program prior to commissioning.

In addition to its regional units, the Warden Service has several specialized teams providing statewide support, including an aviation unit, an investigations team staffed by four detectives, and an incident management team responsible for coordinating large-scale and complex search and rescue operations.

Resources
The Maine Warden Service deploys three fixed-wing aircraft.

See also
 Maine Marine Patrol
 Maine State Police
 Dave Jackson (Maine game warden)

References

State law enforcement agencies of Maine
1880 establishments in Maine